Jane Powell (born 19 January 1957) is an English former cricketer who played as a right-handed batter. She played in six Test matches and 24 One Day Internationals, with a highest score of 115* against India. Powell was captain of England at the 1988 Women's Cricket World Cup, losing in the Final to Australia. She also captained England to Women's European Cricket Championship titles in 1989 and 1990. Her twin sister Jill also represented England. She mainly played domestic cricket for Yorkshire, but also appeared in matches for Sussex and East Anglia.

After retiring from playing, Powell coached the England team during the 2002–03 tour of Australia, as well as being a successful hockey coach.

References

External links
 

1957 births
Living people
England women One Day International cricketers
England women Test cricketers
English cricket coaches
Sussex women cricketers
Yorkshire women cricketers
East Anglia women cricketers
Twin sportspeople
English twins